Medical education in Wales refers to the education of medical students and qualified medical doctors in Wales.

Medical schools 
There are currently two dedicated medical schools in Wales, the Cardiff University School of Medicine and the Swansea University Medical School. Cardiff's is the earliest of the two, founded in 1893, whereas Swansea's was first established as a clinical school in 2001 and later becoming a medical school in 2004 and receiving independent awarding rights in 2014. Both schools offer degrees in Bachelor of Medicine and Surgery (MBBCh). 

Since 2019, Bangor University offers a Graduate Entry Medicine course in collaboration with Cardiff University. In January 2023, it was confirmed that Bangor University would be forming a North Wales Medical School, teaching and awarding a full medical degree from September 2024.

Welsh medium education 
Medical students in Wales would have the option to study at least 30% of their degree in Welsh for the first time from 2015 according to Coleg Cymraeg Cenedlaethol, and receving a scholarship by doing so. In 2021 there were 71 students in Wales pursuing their medical studies in Welsh.

In 2017 a six-part television series, Doctoriaid Yfory, followed students at Cardiff University who were able to use the Welsh language as part of the training, preparing them in particular to work in Welsh-speaking areas of Wales.

From 2023 all medical students in year two of Cardiff medical school will receive mandatory Welsh language training. Students can choose to be part of the fluent, non-fluent and non-Welsh streams, allowing tailored training. Awen Iorwerth, a clinical lecturer at Cardiff medical school, said: "We know that receiving care from someone who recognizes and - possibly - speaks your mother tongue leads to better results and satisfaction." "Recent research has shown that medical students with Welsh skills are more likely to stay and work in Wales after graduating."

Postgraduate education 
Following completion of medical school, junior doctors then enter a vocational training phase. In Wales a doctor's training normally follows this path:

Welsh Foundation School 
The Wales Foundation Programme is coordinated by the Wales Foundation School which is based within Health Education Improvement Wales. These offices are in Nantgarw, South Wales.  Welsh Unpaired Foundation Programme: Foundation Doctors can select F2 placements following the start of their Foundation training and can apply for placement anywhere in Wales, regardless of their F1 placement. The Foundation programmes in Wales meet the clinical competency as required by the Foundation Programme Curriculum and General Medical Council (GMC) national standards and allow full GMC registration.

Speciality Training 
Following completion of the Foundation Programme, a doctor can choose to specialise in one field. All routes involve further assessment and examinations.

General Practice 
To train as a general practitioner (GP), after completing the Foundation Programme, a doctor must complete three years of speciality training. This comprises a minimum of 12 to 18 months of posts in a variety of hospital specialities - often including paediatrics, psychiatry, geriatrics and obstetrics & gynaecology. The trainee spends the remaining 18 to 24 months as a General Practice Speciality Registrar - a trainee based in a GP practice. After completing this training and the membership exams of the Royal College of General Practitioners, the doctor can become a GP and can practise independently.

Hospital Specialty 
Hospital doctors are promoted after sitting relevant postgraduate exams within their chosen speciality (e.g. Member of the Royal College of Physicians MRCP, Member of the Royal College of Surgeons MRCS) and a competitive interview selection process from SHO to Specialty Registrar (StR) and eventually Consultant on completion of the CCT(Certificate of Completion of Training), which is the highest level in a speciality (with the exception of university-linked professors).

The competition is significant for those who wish to attain consultant level and many now complete higher degrees in research such as a Doctorate of Medicine (MD), which is a thesis-based award based on at least two years of full-time research; or PhD which involves at least three years of full-time research. The time taken to get from medical school graduation to becoming a consultant varies from speciality to speciality but can be anything from 7 to over 10 years.

Continuing medical education 
Continuing medical education is now mandatory for all doctors, under guidelines from the General Medical Council and Clinical governance.

See also 

 Healthcare in Wales
 Certificate of Completion of Training
 Clinical governance
 INMED
 Modernising Medical Careers

References 

Health in Wales
Education in Wales